Bongaigaon is a major city in the Indian state of Assam. Its urban area spans across Bongaigaon and Chirang district. The city also serves as the gateway of the North-East Frontier Railway Zone with its New Bongaigaon Junction railway station, the second biggest railway station in North-East India. It also acts as the district headquarters of Bongaigaon district and commercial and industrial hub of the west part of the state of Assam. Bongaigaon is one of the most populated urban agglomerations in Assam, alongside Guwahati, Jorhat, Dibrugarh and Silchar.

The city was the last capital of Koch Hajo and is home to many historical monuments of Koch Rajbongshi and Kamatapuri cultures. To meet the demands of the Bodo people of Assam, Bongaigaon was divided up to create Chirang district. Bongaigaon has a major petrochemical industry, the Indian Oil Corporation Limited (IOCL BGR). The town joined the Indian Railways system with the establishment of the railway station in the year 1908. Most of the city's institutions, such as ITI, Bongaigaon College, the Office of the Assam State Electricity Board and other elements of the town's development were established in the early 1960s. The city developed further with the establishment of the Bongaigaon Refinery and Petrochemicals Limited (BRPL) complex in the year 1972 at Dhaligaon, and the Thermal Power Plant at Salakati. Though these areas are not within the limits of Bongaigaon Municipality, the town also caters to the demand of this population.

The city today has evolved to be one of the major commercial and business hubs of the state, with increasing numbers of shopping malls, restaurants, hotels, residential apartments and educational institutions. The city also serves as the base for tourism to places such as the Manas National Park. Centrally located within the state, the city has a vibrant Assamese township and culture.

Etymology
According to lore, the name 'Bongaigaon' derives from the words 'bon' (wild) and 'gai' (cow). In the distant past, wild cows were often a menace to villagers in this area, due to which the district got its name.

History

Bijni Kingdom
The area was ruled by zamindars hailing from the Koch belonging to Indo-Mongoloid ethnic group of peoples from the 15th century to the end of princely states in 1956.

Administrative changes under British rule
The original Goalpara district was first created in 1822 by David Scott, an employee of the East India Company and the first Commissioner of newly created North east Rangpur district headquarters at Rangpur town (now in Bangladesh). The newly created Goalpara district was connected with North-east Rangpur district for administration. The area, formerly part of the Bijni Kingdom, which included the undivided Garo Hills district constituted the Undivided Goalpara district area in 1822. In 1866, Garo Hills was separated from the Goalpara district area, and in the same year a new district named "Greater Koch Behar" was created and the remaining portion of Goalpara district was withdrawn from Rangpur and tagged with Koch Behar. In 1874 a new province, the Assam Valley Province, was created by the British government, and Goalpara district area was withdrawn from Koch Behar and tagged with Assam Province, which continues until today. The original Goalpara district is now split into five districts: Goalpara, Dhubri, Kokrajhar, Bongaigoan, and Chirang.

Creation of Bongaigaon and modern era

On 14 March 1989, bombs from separatist tribal militants exploded in Bongaigaon, killing 17 and wounding at least 48.

The government of Assam decided in 1989 to create a new district of Bongaigaon, carving out some areas of the Goalpara and Kokrajhar Districts with its headquarters located at Bongaigaon. On 29 September 1989, the creation of Bongaigaon District was declared by the Government of Assam with its headquarters at Bongaigaon. In 2005, the Government of Assam declared Bongaigaon to be a city.

In June 2022, heavy floods in Assam affected the residents of Bongaigaon.

Administration
The Bongaigaon Town Committee was first constituted in the year 1961 and was upgraded to a Municipal Board in the year 1977. Presently the Municipal Area consists of 25 wards covering an area of 14.31 sq m.

Bongaigaon is part of Barpeta (Lok Sabha constituency). Phani Bhusan Choudhury is the current M.L.A. of the Bongaigaon constituency.

Geography
It has an average altitude of 62.6 metres. The town is situated 200 km west of the State Capital and has an important place in the communication network of Assam and wider northeast India. The New Bongaigaon railway station is a major hub connecting Assam with the rest of India. This town is also very well connected by road through the National Highways 31 B and 31C. This connectivity and the strategic location of the town in the region has made it an important center in trade and commerce in Western Assam, serving a vast hinterland. It is one of the biggest industrial towns in Lower Assam. The district is part of the Brahmaputra river's basin.

Climate
Bongaigaon has a borderline monsoon-influenced humid subtropical climate (Köppen Cwa) marginally too cool to be a tropical savanna climate (Aw). During the "cool" season from November to February, afternoons are warm to very warm and mornings are cool. In the "hot" season of March and April, the weather becomes hot and thunderstorm rainfalls increase in frequency to prelude the oppressive monsoon season from June to September where heavy rainfall occurs every afternoon.

Localities in Bongaigaon

 Mayapuri
 Borpara
 Paglasthan
 Mahabeersthan
 Chapaguri
 Dhaligaon
 New Bongaigaon
 Borsongaon
 Deuripara
 Purani Bongaigaon
 BOC Gate
 Rolling Mill
 Dolaigaon
 Notunpara
 Kukurmari
 Hatimutra
 Salbari
 New Colony (Railway)
 Old Colony (Railway)
 Salbagan
 Bhakarivita

Demography
On the Bongaigaon city municipal board, Hindus comprise the majority by 90.73%. The majority of the city population works in the service industry.

Bongaigaon city area has a population of 139,650 as per the 2011 census. Bengali is spoken by 49,617 people, Assamese by 34,814, Hindi by 18,768, and 36,448 people speak other languages.

Economy

Media and technology
The most popular Assamese newspaper of Assam, Asomiya Pratidin, is published from Bongaigaon along with Guwahati, Dibrugarh and North Lakhimpur.

Indian Oil Corporation Limited
The Bongaigaon Refinery is the eighth largest refinery of Indian Oil. Formed upon the amalgamation of Bongaigaon Refinery and Petrochemicals Limited (BRPL) with Indian Oil on 25 March 2009, Bongaigaon refinery is situated at Dhaligaon in Chirang district of Assam, 200 km west of Guwahati.

It has two Crude Distillation Units (CDU), two Delayed Coker Units, and a Coke Calcination Unit (CCU) with a processing capacity of 2.35 million tonnes per year of crude oil. The first CDU with a capacity of 1 million tonnes per year was commissioned in 1979. The capacity was increased to 1.35 million tonnes per year in 1986. An LPG bottling plant with a capacity of 44 million tonnes per year was commissioned in 2003.

The refinery produces a wide range of petroleum products, namely LPG, Naphtha, MS, SKO, HSD, LDO, LSHS, LVFO, RPC, CPC, Needle coke and solvents (Petrosol and Bonmex-II) by processing Assam Crude and Ravva Crude (from the Ravva oil fields of the Krishna Godavari Basin). Bongaigaon refinery has developed an ecological park and a pond surrounding it containing 65,000 cubic metres of water, through which the storm water drains of the plant are routed for final discharge. Another natural pond with a capacity of 30,000 cubic meters of water has been developed into an ecological reserve for migratory birds. A rainwater harvesting system has been installed in the Bongaigaon township complex and the installation of solar water heating systems and solar photovoltaic streetlights is underway. Bongaigaon refinery has received several awards for its ecological efforts, including a National Award for "Prevention of Pollution" from the Ministry of Environment and Forests on 16 September 2010, the Indira Gandhi Paryavaran Puruskar from the Ministry of Environment in 2006, and the Greentech Environment Excellence Gold Award in 2008.

Bongaigaon Refinery Township (BGR Township)

BGR Township is a residential campus for employees of the Indian Oil Corporation BGR. The town is located in Dhaligaon near Bongaigaon Refinery. In the township there are two schools (BGR HS School and DPS Dhaigaon) and two clubs, RCCC Club & Auditorium and Champa Club & Play Hub.

Transport

Air
The nearest domestic and international airport is Lokpriya Gopinath Bordoloi International Airport, Guwahati.

Railways

Bongaigaon falls under the Northeast Frontier Railway zone of the Indian Railways network. There are two stations in Bongaigaon: New Bongaigaon railway station (the second largest railway junction in Assam) and Bongaigaon (old) station. Major trains serving Bongaigaon with major cities are the Dibrugarh Rajdhani Express, Poorvottar Sampark Kranti Express, Saraighat Express, Brahmaputra Mail, North-East Express, Guwahati Bangalore Express, Guwahati Ernakulam Express, and Kamrup Express. It is the largest station in Western Assam after Guwahati. According to the 2012 budget, New Bongaigaon Jn. is considered to be the Adarsh Station of India.

This was also the reason for constructing the New Bongaigaon railway station.

A new railway track from New Bongaigaon to Guwahati was commissioned in 1984.

Saraighat Bridge opened in 1962. It initially carried a metre gauge track, which was later replaced by broad gauge.

Roadways
National Highway 31 connects Bongaigaon with the states of Bihar, Jharkhand and West Bengal. National Highway 37 via Naranarayan Setu from Goalpara in Assam to Dimapur in Nagaland traverses the entire length of Assam and connects Bongaigaon with almost all the major cities of Assam, including Jorhat and Dibrugarh. National Highways 31C and 37 both connect Bongaigaon with Guwahati. There are several bus terminals in the city, providing connections with major cities of Assam such as Basugaon, Mangaldai, Gossaigaon, Dhubri, Barpeta, Tezpur, Goalpara, Abhayapuri, Kokrajhar, Bijni, Siliguri, Cooch Behar and Guwahati.

Infrastructure

In 2010 Bongaigaon city built the Bir Chilarai Flyover, to address the city's busy railway and road traffic, connecting three parts of the city:
 New Bongaigaon with the western part of Bongaigaon
 The north part of Bongaigaon City with the centre of Bongaigaon
 New Bongaigaon with the northern part of Bongaigaon City

Healthcare
There are 9 hospitals in Bongaigaon city:

 S M Hospital
 Lower Assam Hospital And Research Centre
 Swagat Hospital
 Chilarai Nursing Home
 Arogya Hospital and Research Centre
 St. Augustine's Hospital
 Bongaigaon Civil Hospital
 Kajalgaon Civil Hospital
 New Bongaigaon Railway Hospital
 Bongaigaon Refinery Hospital

Education

The number of schools in the city increased more rapidly after the refinery came into operation. They include: 

 Bongaigaon Refinery HS School, Dhaligaon (previously BRPL Vidyalaya)
 DPS Dhaligaon, Bongaigaon Refinery
 Vivekananda Vidyapith Higher Secondary School
 LB ACCADEMY
 Borpara L.P School

Colleges in the city include:

 Bongaigaon College, established in 1964
 Birjhora Mahavidyalaya (Degree Science College)
 Bongaigaon Law College
 Bongaigaon B.Ed. College
DIET, Majgaon
 BGR Higher Secondary

Landmarks

Entertainment and commercial centres

The city has two movie theatres: Jolly Max Theater and Mayapuri Cinema. There are various public markets in different parts of the city.

Koyakujia Bil

The park consists of many small islands with myriad flora and fauna, including many migratory birds.

Bagheswari Temple

Bagheshwari Temple is a temple devoted to Goddess Durga for followers of the Hindu religion in Western Assam. The temple is located in the centre of the city, in Borpara. According to legend, the king of Abhayapuri decided to build a temple after a sword was found at the site. The name of the temple means "devoted to the tiger" (Bagh), taken from a nearby hill, Bagheswari pahar, where tigers lived as late as the middle of the 20th century.

Bagheswari Hill
Bagheswari hill, situated in the middle of the city, has a Shiv temple at its peak, and elevated views of the whole city.

Kakoijana Forest Reserve

Covering an area of around 20 km2 to the south-east of the city, the park is known for its populations of golden langur and birds.

Manas National Park

Bongaigaon city is the entry point for the Manas National Park and wildlife sanctuary, a UNESCO listed natural World Heritage Site, a Project Tiger reserve, an elephant reserve and a biosphere reserve. Located in the Himalayan foothills, it is contiguous with the Royal Manas National Park in Bhutan. The park is home to rare and endangered endemic wildlife such as the Assam roofed turtle, hispid hare, golden langur and pygmy hog, and is well-known for its population of wild water buffalo.

Sports

The multipurpose Chilarai Stadium is situated at Barshangaon, on the outskirts of Bongaigaon. The town also has an indoor stadium named Chilarai Indoor Stadium, a swimming pool at Borpara, and a mini stadium near Chapguri Road.

See also
 Bongaigaon Municipal Board
 List of cities in Assam by population

References

External links

 Bongaigaon District official govt. website
 

 
Cities and towns in Bongaigaon district